Christophersen Glacier is a glacier  long, flowing west into Jacobsen Bight on the south coast of South Georgia. It was surveyed by the South Georgia Survey in the period 1951–57, and named by the UK Antarctic Place-Names Committee for Pedro Christophersen, one of the first Directors of the Compañía Argentina de Pesca which operated the Grytviken whaling station for more than 50 years beginning in 1904.

See also
 List of glaciers in the Antarctic
 Glaciology

References 

Glaciers of South Georgia